
This is a list of aircraft in numerical order of manufacturer followed by alphabetical order beginning with 'M'.

Md

MD Helicopters 
 MD 500C (369H)
 MD 500M Defender (369HM)
 MD 500C (369HS)
 MD 500C (369HE)
 MD 500D (369D)
 MD 500E (369E)
 KH-500E
 NH-500E
 MD 520N
 MD 530F (369F)
 MD 600
 MD 600N
 MD Explorer
 MD 900 Explorer
 MD 901 Explorer
 MD 902
 MH-90 Enforcer
 MD Combat Explorer

MDG 
(Matériel-Denis-Gruson / Louis Delasalle)
 MDG LD.26 Midgy-Club
 MDG LD.261 Midgy-Club
 MDG LD.45

References

Further reading

External links 

 List Of Aircraft (M)

fr:Liste des aéronefs (I-M)